How to Fight Anti-Semitism, written by journalist Bari Weiss, explores the history and current manifestations of antisemitism and attempts to provide strategies to oppose it. Weiss identifies the main strains of antisemitism as left-wing, right-wing, and Islamic antisemitism, and tries to provide a history of each variety. Weiss said that the book will discuss the "alarming rise of antisemitism in (the United States) and in Europe", and will propose ways to address the problem.

As of January 2022, the book was translated into French and Arabic.

Reception
Tal Lavin of The Nation says that Weiss presents an anti-intellectual argument in her exploration of antisemitism. Lavin says that Weiss presents simplistic caricatures of both the left and the right, and that the presentation of Muslim antisemitism suggests exclusion of Muslim groups from Europe under a veil of plausible deniability. Lavin concludes his review by stating that the "profound lack of intellectual curiosity, proportionality, and material analysis in the book renders it worse than simply useless."

Jordan Weissmann of Slate presents a sharp critique of Weiss's book. Weissmann highlights as his central criticism the false equivalence between antisemitism on the right and on the left. He argues that by reaching towards genocide as the endpoint of left-wing antisemitism, Weiss far overstates her case. In addition, Weissman argues that Weiss often fails to present a complete picture of events and people, that Weiss never explores evangelical antisemitism, and that Weiss presents an oversimplified view of how antisemitic radicalization occurs.

See also
Antisemitism in Europe
Antisemitism in the United States

References

2019 non-fiction books
Books about antisemitism
Crown Publishing Group books